Jody Lee Lipes (born January 18, 1982) is an American cinematographer and filmmaker.

A native of Doylestown, Pennsylvania, Lipes attended New York University, where he studied film. He worked extensively on short films before serving as cinematographer on Afterschool, directed by Antonio Campos and Tiny Furniture, directed by Lena Dunham. Lipes would collaborate with Dunham again as cinematographer and director for several episodes of her HBO series Girls. Lipes would later work as cinematographer for Girls producer Judd Apatow's comedy Trainwreck, starring Amy Schumer. Lipes worked as cinematographer for Kenneth Lonergan's drama Manchester by the Sea, which he shot digitally.

As a director, he helmed a documentary on the NY Export Opus Jazz ballet, which had a screening at the annual South by Southwest festival, and the documentary Ballet 422, which screened at the 2014 Tribeca Film Festival.

Lipes became a member of the American Society of Cinematographers (ASC) in 2021.

Filmography 
Film

Television

References

External links
Jody Lee Lipes at the Internet Movie Database

1982 births
American cinematographers
New York University alumni
People from Doylestown, Pennsylvania
Living people